FASTRAD is a tool dedicated to the calculation of radiation effects (Dose and Displacement Damage) on electronics. The tool includes a 3d modelling interface with all the capabilities required for the representation of any system.  Application areas include: high energy physics and nuclear experiments, medical, accelerator and space physics studies. The software is used by radiation engineers around the world.

History 
FASTRAD is a radiation tool dedicated to the analysis and design of radiation sensitive systems.  The project was created in 1999 and has constantly been improved since.  This software can be applied to any radiation related field.

The radiation hardness assurance of satellite manufacturers has been continuously improved over the last decade.  The optimization of space systems in terms of either mechanical design to increase the ratio power/mass, or miniaturization of electronic devices tends to increase the sensitivity of those systems to the space radiation environment.  In order to mitigate the impact on the radiation hardness process, the first solution is to replace the rough shielding analysis by an accurate estimate of the real radiation constraint on the system.  This corresponds to the solution provided by FASTRAD for the deposited dose estimate.

The main goal of the software is to reduce the margins stemming from a conservative approach of estimating radiation analysis, while reducing the cycle time of mechanical design changes for shielding optimization.  In some cases, it can be used to justify the use of non rad-hard parts and save cost and planning for space program equipment. Its features allow use of CAD import files, and/or 3D viewing and geometry construction.

For space applications, this software can consider a complete satellite model from the platform structure down to the electronic components.

Radiation CAD interface
This software is dedicated to engineers who do not necessarily have an extensive experience in CAD applications.  This user-friendly interface was developed to construct 3D radiation models using simple functions.

The main CAD capabilities of the tool are:
 Creation of Box, Sphere, Cylinder, Cone and triangular Prism
 Insertion of complex 3D geometries coming from STEP or IGES format files
 Modelling tool set (clipping plane, 2D projection, measurement tool, colors, view shot,…)

The core of the software is the radiation 3D modeler.  The goal of the engine is to make a realistic model of any mechanical design including material properties.  The main part of the interface is devoted to the display window where the user can manipulate the geometry.

The 3D solids can be defined either by using the component toolbar or by importing them from other 3rd party software (CATIA, Pro/Engineer…) with the standard STEP or IGES format.  The Open Cascade library included in FASTRAD provides advanced visualization capabilities like cut operations, complex shape management, and STEP and IGES exchange format modules.  The advanced STEP module allows you to import the hierarchy, name and color information.  The full 3D designer model is then managed by FASTRAD (visualization, radiation calculation, post-processing).  This software easily handles complex geometry and manages different length scales in the same model from the nanometer to 1024km.  

A key element related to the radiation applications is the materials management.  A dedicated user-friendly interface allows you to set the material properties of each solid of the 3D model, such as the density and the mass ratio of each element of the (compound) material by determining its chemical composition (see Fig. 1.).  The list of predefined materials can be easily extended by the user.

Another functionality is the detectors positioning.  These detectors can be placed at any location in the model.  In this way, radiation effects can be estimated at any point of the 3D model using a Monte Carlo algorithm for a fine calculation of energy deposition by particle-matter interaction (see “Dose calculation and shielding” below), or for a ray-tracing approach.

Moreover, the use of this software is compliant to late design changes and/or equipment re-use.  For design changes, only the new files can be simply imported and/or modified in Fastrad.  The processing of the sectorial analysis can then take place.  Direct calculation of shielding efficiency using the user-friendly graphical interface can be performed and direct access to the masses of the different parts is possible to achieve shielding/mass increase trade-off.  For equipment re-use, only the radiation environment data that is provided for deposited dose calculations has to be changed.

At any time of the 3D modeling, the user can save his model with all the information (geometry, materials, detectors) defined during the current session.

Several more helpful features (local frame display, interactive measurement tool, context menus,…) are included in the interface.  The goal is to provide CAD software that can be used by engineers who want to minimize the modeling time in order to spend more time on radiation analysis.

Dose calculation and shielding
Once the 3D radiation model is done, the user can perform a deposited dose estimate using the sector analysis module of the software.  This ray-tracing module combines the information coming from the radiation model with the information of the radiation environment using a Dose Depth Curve.  This dose depth curve gives the deposited dose in a target material (mainly Silicon for electronic devices) behind an Aluminum spherical shielding thickness.  This calculation is performed for each detector placed in the 3D model.  Even for complex geometries, the efficient and rapid calculation provides two kinds of information:

 the 3D distribution mass around each detector
 the estimated deposited dose in an isotropic radiation environment

 
Using a post-processing of those results, FASTRAD provides information about optimum shielding location using several viewing representation types.  Figure 2. presents a mapping of the mass distribution viewed by one component of an electronic board.  The red area indicates the critical directions in terms of shielding thickness.

The user is able to optimize the size of additional shielding that can be used to decrease the received dose on the studied detector.

The main advantage of this process is the short time needed to complete this task and the well defined mechanical shielding solution provided by the sector analysis post-processing.

Monte Carlo algorithm
The dose calculation in the software is particularly efficient with the Monte Carlo module (developed through a partnership with the CNES).  This algorithm can be used either in a forward process or a reverse one.  In the first case, the software manages the transport of electrons and photons (including secondary particles) from 1keV to 10 MeV, in the 3D model.  Creation of secondary photons and electrons are taken into account.  Any type of energy spectrum and source geometry can be defined.  Sensitive volumes (SV) are selected by the user and FASTRAD computes the deposited energy inside the SVs.  The reverse Monte Carlo module is dedicated to the dose calculation due to an isotropic irradiation of electrons in a complex and multi-scale geometry, and as a result, the forward algorithm can lead to huge computational times. The principle of the reverse method is to use: 

 A forward particle tracking method in the vicinity of the SV 
 A backward particle tracking method from the SV to the external source.

The Reverse Monte Carlo method for electron transport takes into account the energy deposition due to primary electrons and secondary photons.

The Monte Carlo module was successfully verified through a comparison with GEANT4 results for the forward algorithm and with US Format for the reverse method.  One example is the case of a piece of electronic equipment in a satellite structure. The radiation environment corresponds to the electron energy spectrum of a geostationary mission (from 10 keV up to 5 MeV).

In the future, the Monte Carlo module will be able to manage protons and positrons.

Interface to Geant4
Geant4 is a particle-matter interaction toolkit maintained by a worldwide collaboration of scientists and software engineers.  This C++ library contains a wide range of interaction cross section data and models together with a tracking engine of particles through a 3D geometry.

The Geant4 interface implemented in the FASTRAD software provides a tool able to create the 3D geometry, define the particle source, set the physics list and create all the resulting source files in a ready-to-compile Geant4 project. The tool is useful for young engineers who need to be driven into the Geant4 world, and who can use FASTRAD as a tutorial tool, or by experts who do not want to spend time on the creation of C++ files that describe the geometry, material, and basic physics and who can use the Geant4 project created by FASTRAD as a base that can be enhanced by specific features relative to their physical application.  The Geant4 interface gives the software a wide range of radiation related fields, as Geant4 is already used for space, medical, nuclear, aeronautical and military applications. Its intuitive and powerful radiation CAD capabilities facilitate the engineering process for any radiation sensitive system analysis.

Bunker Tool
Another module is the bunker designer tool that calculates the concrete wall thickness of irradiation rooms by considering the room’s geometry, the type and activity of the source and the acceptable dose rate.

Technical specifications
FASTRAD was developed using C++ with OpenGL to manage the 3D and Open Cascade library for the STEP import and Boolean operations. It was tested under Mac and LINUX using an OS emulator (PowerPC, VMware …).

Computer Requirements: Configuration: Windows Vista/XP/NT/2000 - 512 Mo RAM - 50 Mo HDD.

See also
 NOVICE (EMPC) 
 Geant4  "GEometry ANd Tracking"
 IGES  “Initial Graphics Exchange Specification”
 CATIA  “Computer Aided Three-dimensional Interactive Application”
 Latchup
 RayXpert"3D modelization software that calculates the gamma dose rate by Monte Carlo"

References
“FASTRAD V3.1: Radiation shielding tool with a new Monte Carlo module” by J.-C. THOMAS, P. POURROUQUET, P.-F. PEYRARD, D. LAVIELLE, R. ECOFFET(1), G. ROLLAND(1)  - (1) CNES, 18 avenue Edouard Belin, 31401 TOULOUSE Cedex 9, France – April 2010
“FASTRAD: A 3D CAD Interface for radiation calculation and shielding“ by J.-C. THOMAS, T. BEUTIER, P. POURROUQUET, P.-F PEYRARD, D. LAVIELLE, C. CHATRY – April 2008

External links
FASTRAD is distributed by TRAD. Official TRAD website
Official FASTRAD website

physics software
Nuclear physics
Radiation effects